Beckjay is a hamlet in the south of the English county of Shropshire.

A relative of this family, Brian de Jay, was the last recorded master of the English Knights Templar.

Forming part of the civil parish of Clungunford, Beckjay is close to the border with Herefordshire on the west bank of the River Clun. It was a medieval township. Nearby are the hamlets of Hopton Heath, which has a railway station on the Heart of Wales Line, and Broadward with its 18th-century hall.

There is a Royal Mail post box in the hamlet. The settlement also features a house with a thatched-roof. A duck pond exists just to the south of the settlement, downhill from it.

The former Beckjay Mill (situated to the northeast of the hamlet, on the Clun) was the subject of several paintings by David Cox.

See also
Listed buildings in Clungunford

References

External links

Hamlets in Shropshire